The 1926–27 North Carolina Tar Heels men's basketball team represented the University of North Carolina during the 1926–27 NCAA men's basketball season in the United States. The team finished the season with a 17–7 record.

This season was James N. Ashmore's first year as the head coach for this University. During this time, the team was nicknamed the "White Phantoms," a name that originated in Atlanta by a sportswriter. This team started off their season by playing 5 games against YMCA teams as a way to prepare themselves for the league games. Bunn Hackney was a captain of this team and was named to the All-Southern Conference tournament first-team in 1926 and All-Southern Conference second-team in 1927.

References

 North Carolina Tar Heels men's basketball seasons
North Carolina
North Carolina Tar Heels Men's Basketball Team
North Carolina Tar Heels Men's Basketball Team